The following are the events that occurred in the year 1900 in Portugal.

Incumbents
Monarch: Charles I
Prime Minister: 
José Luciano de Castro (Progressive) (until 26 June)
Ernesto Hintze Ribeiro (Regeneraton) (from 26 June)

Events
28 May – A solar eclipse occurs with the path of totality crossing north-central Portugal.
26 June – Ernesto Hintze Ribeiro replaces José Luciano de Castro as Prime Minister.
October or November – The first sound recordings made in Portugal are produced in Porto by engineer William Darby, who creates a series of gramophone discs documenting sounds of local music as part of a European recording campaign for the Gramophone Company.
25 November – Legislative election: The Regeneration Party of Prime Minister Ernesto Hintze Ribeiro wins an absolute majority in the Chamber of Deputies, taking 104 of the 138 seats available. The Progressive Party wins 28 seats to finish as the second largest party.

Undated
The Lousal mine in the modern-day Setúbal District begins its 88-year history as a source of pyrite for agricultural sulphur fertilisers.

Arts and entertainment

Sports

Births
17 January – , philanthropist ( 1996).
22 April – Tomaz Vieira da Cruz, poet ( 1960).
9 June – José Gomes Ferreira, writer ( 1985).
30 July – , politician and physician ( 2004).

Deaths

2 March – António de Serpa Pimentel, Prime Minister of Portugal (1890) (b. 1825).
18 March – António Nobre, poet ( 1867).
30 July – , jurist and politician ( 1834).
16 August – José Maria de Eça de Queirós, writer ( 1845).
28 December – Alexandre de Serpa Pinto, explorer and administrator, Governor-General of Cape Verde ( 1846).

References

 
1900s in Portugal
Portugal
Years of the 19th century in Portugal
Portugal